{{DISPLAYTITLE:C16H16O7}}
The molecular formula C16H16O7 (molar mass: 320.29 g/mol, exact mass: 320.0896 u) may refer to:

 Austrocortirubin
 Barceloneic acid A

Molecular formulas